Barbara Ann Finch (November 17, 1952 – December 17, 2008) was an American politician.

Barbara Ann Davis was born in New York City to parents James and Ruth Davis on November 17, 1952. She attended Nassau Community College and Creighton University. Davis married Robert Finch in 1981. The couple farmed and raised three children near Ames, Iowa.

Barbara Finch served on a number of agricultural commissions, including the Story County Farm Bureau, Story County Cattleman's Association, and the Governor's Task Force for Sustainable Agriculture, as well as the Ballard School Board. She was elected to the Iowa House of Representatives in 2000, as a Republican, succeeding Dennis Parmenter as the legislator from District 62. Finch contested the Iowa Senate's 23rd District seat in 2002, losing the general election to Herman Quirmbach.

After leaving the state legislature, Finch worked for Mary Greeley Medical Center. Finch died on December 17, 2008, aged 56. She and her daughter were traveling on Interstate 35 in Freeborn County, Minnesota, near Albert Lea, when their van collided with a pickup that had slid into oncoming traffic. The Finches' vehicle then struck a semi-trailer truck. Barbara Finch was declared dead at the scene. Her daughter survived with injuries.

References

1952 births
2008 deaths
21st-century American women politicians
21st-century American politicians
Politicians from Ames, Iowa
Politicians from New York City
Creighton University alumni
Iowa Republicans
Nassau Community College alumni
Road incident deaths in Minnesota
School board members in Iowa
Farmers from Iowa